Giovanna Carmella Babbo (September 22, 1930 – February 20, 2022), known professionally as Joni James, was an American singer of traditional pop music.

Biography
Giovanna Carmella Babbo was born to an Italian-American family in Chicago, Illinois, on September 22, 1930, as one of six children supported by her widowed mother. As an adolescent, she studied drama and ballet, and on graduating from Bowen High School, located in the South Chicago neighborhood, went with a local dance group on a tour of Canada. She then took a job as a chorus girl in the Edgewater Beach Hotel in Chicago.

After doing a fill-in in Indiana, she decided to pursue a singing career, and picked the stage name Joni James at the urging of her managers. Some executives at Metro-Goldwyn-Mayer (MGM) spotted her in a television commercial, and she was signed by MGM in 1952. Her first hit, "Why Don't You Believe Me?", sold over two million copies. She had a number of hits following that one, including "Your Cheatin' Heart" (a cover of Hank Williams' hit) and "Have You Heard?". She was the first American to record at London's Abbey Road Studios, and recorded five albums there. She was also very popular across parts of the Asia-Pacific region, particularly in the Philippines where she performed at Manila's now defunct EM Club in 1957. She also scored a big hit in Manila with Filipino composer Salvador Asuncion's work titled "In Despair".

Joni James had seven Top 10 hits on any of the different Billboard charts that existed previously to the Hot 100. "Why Don't You Believe Me?" (No. 1 in 1952) "Have You Heard?" (No. 4 in 1953)  "Your Cheatin' Heart" (No. 2 in 1953) "Almost Always" (No. 9 in 1953) "My Love, My Love" (No. 8 in 1953) "How Important Can It Be?" (No. 2 in 1955) and "You Are My Love" (No. 6 in 1955) as well as sixteen other Top 40 hits from 1952 to 1960. She has sold more than 100 million records and recorded more than 25 albums.

Personal life
James married composer-conductor Anthony "Tony" Acquaviva at St. Patrick's Cathedral, New York in 1956. In 1964, she retired from the music industry in part because Acquaviva was in bad health and needed her attention. She cared for him until his death in 1986.

Shortly after her first husband's death, James met retired Air Force General Bernard Schriever, two decades her senior. He had led the crash program that developed U.S. ballistic missiles — both ICBMs and IRBMs in 1953–62. The couple wed on October 5, 1997, in Arlington, Virginia. They honeymooned in France and the Greek Isles, then took up residence in Schriever's home in Washington, D.C. Bernard Schriever died on June 20, 2005, aged 94.

Later years
For many years she was out of the public eye, but began touring again in the mid-1990s some years after she was widowed, performing memorable concerts at New York's Town Hall, Carnegie Hall and Avery Fisher Hall.

In October 2001, just a few weeks after 9/11, she appeared at the Academy of Music in Philadelphia, accompanied by the Count Basie orchestra. The streets of the city were still lined with armed soldiers, and she was a guest of honor at the American Film Institute's Life Achievement Tribute to Barbra Streisand. With her renewed popularity, nearly her entire body of work was released on the Capitol-EMI, DRG and Taragon labels under her personal supervision and, in 2000, she released a new recording, Latest and Greatest.

James died at a hospital in West Palm Beach, Florida, on February 20, 2022, at the age of 91. She was interred at Arlington National Cemetery.

For her contributions to the entertainment industry, James has a star on the Hollywood Walk of Fame.

Singles

Albums
 Let There Be Love MGM (1954)
 Joni James' "Award Winning Album" MGM 3346 (1954)
 Little Girl Blue MGM (1955)
 When I Fall in Love MGM (1955)
 In the Still of the Night MGM (1956)
 Songs by Victor Young and Songs by Frank Loesser MGM (1956) – later reissued as My Foolish Heart
 Merry Christmas from Joni MGM (1956)
 Give Us This Day (Songs of Inspiration) MGM (1957)
 Sings Songs by Jerome Kern and Songs by Harry Warren MGM (1957)
 Among My Souvenirs MGM (1958)
 Je T'aime... I Love You MGM (1958)
 Songs of Hank Williams MGM (1959)
 Joni Swings Sweet MGM (1959)
 Joni Sings Irish Favo(u)rites MGM (1959)
 100 Strings and Joni MGM 3755 (1959)
 Joni at Carnegie Hall MGM (1960)
 I'm In the Mood for Love MGM (1960)
 100 Strings & Joni In Hollywood MGM (1960) – also known as Joni Sings Hollywood
 One Hundred Voices... One Hundred Strings & Joni MGM (1960) – also stylized as 100 Voices, 100 Strings & Joni
 100 Strings & Joni On Broadway MGM (1960)
 The Mood is Blue MGM (1961)
 The Mood is Romance MGM (1961)
 The Mood is Swinging MGM (1961)
 Folk Songs by Joni James MGM (1961) – also known as Joni Sings Folksongs
 Ti Voglio Bene... I Love You MGM (1961)
 Joni After Hours MGM (1962)
 I'm Your Girl MGM (1962)
 Country Style MGM (1962)
 I Feel a Song Coming On MGM (1962)
 Like 3 O'Clock in the Morning MGM (1962)
 Something for the Boys MGM (1963)
 Beyond The Reef MGM (1964)
 Joni Sings the Gershwins MGM (1964)
 My Favorite Things MGM (1964)
 Put On A Happy Face MGM (1964)
 Italianissima! MGM (1964)
 Bossa Nova Style MGM 4286 (1965)
 Why Don't You Believe Me? Bygone Days BYD77053 (2010) – compilation

References

External links
 Sangley Naval Station Message Board
 
 Gary James Interview with Joni James
 Joni James at Find A Grave
 
 

1930 births
2022 deaths
20th-century American singers
20th-century American women singers
21st-century American women
American people of Italian descent
American women pop singers
MGM Records artists
Singers from Chicago
Traditional pop music singers
Burials at Arlington National Cemetery